The Daqing–Guangzhou Expressway, designated as G45 and commonly referred to as the Daguang Expressway is an expressway that connects the cities of Daqing, Heilongjiang, and Guangzhou, Guangdong. When fully complete, it will be  in length.

Route
Once complete the Daqing–Guangzhou Expressway will run from Daqing, Heilongjiang to Guangzhou, Guangdong. It passes through the following major cities;
 Daqing, Heilongjiang
 Songyuan, Jilin
 Shuangliao, Jilin
 Tongliao, Inner Mongolia
 Chifeng, Inner Mongolia
 Chengde, Hebei
 Beijing
 Bazhou, Hebei
 Hengshui, Hebei
 Puyang, Henan
 Kaifeng, Henan
 Zhoukou, Henan
 Huanggang, Hubei
 Huangshi, Hubei
 Xinyu, Jiangxi
 Ji'an, Jiangxi
 Ganzhou, Jiangxi
 Guangzhou, Guangdong

History

The first section of the expressway opened in the north of Beijing in 2002. Northeast of Beijing the 210 kilometre section to Chengde was known as the Jingcheng expressway(Chinese: 京承高速公路; pinyin: Jīngchéng Gāosù Gōnglù) and south, the section to Kaifeng was known as the Jingkai Expressway (京开高速公路, Hanyu Pinyin: Jīngkāi Gāosù Gōnglù).  Expressway naming was standardised across China in 2009 and the entire length from Daqing to Guangzhou became the G45 expressway.

Detailed Route

The following is a list of towns, cities and major interchanges along the expressway .

References

Chinese national-level expressways
Expressways in Beijing
Expressways in Guangdong
Expressways in Jiangxi
Expressways in Hubei
Expressways in Henan
Expressways in Hebei
Expressways in Inner Mongolia
Expressways in Jilin
Expressways in Heilongjiang